Květa Peschke and Demi Schuurs were the defending champions, but chose to compete with different partners. Peschke partnered Ellen Perez, and Schuurs partnered Nicole Melichar. Both teams lost to Samantha Stosur and Zhang Shuai; Perez and Peschke did so in the second round, whilst Melichar and Schuurs lost in the quarterfinals.

Stosur and Zhang went on to win the title, defeating Gabriela Dabrowski and Luisa Stefani in the final, 7–5, 6–3.

Seeds
The top four seeds received a bye into the second round.

Draw

Finals

Top half

Bottom half

References

External links
Main draw

Women's Doubles